114th meridian may refer to:

114th meridian east, a line of longitude east of the Greenwich Meridian
114th meridian west, a line of longitude west of the Greenwich Meridian